Wayne J. Gates  is a Canadian politician who has represented Niagara Falls in the Legislative Assembly of Ontario since 2014. A member of the Ontario New Democratic Party (NDP), he was elected in a February 2014 by-election in and would be re-elected in subsequent general elections.

Background
Prior to entering provincial politics, Gates was a City Councillor for the City of Niagara Falls, and president of a Unifor local in the Niagara Falls, Ontario. He also served as the campaign chair for the United Way, was a member the Yellow Shirt Brigade to save the Fort Erie hospital, member of the city's recreation committee, Project Share volunteer, and member of the Ontario Health Coalition.

Political career
Gates ran as the federal New Democratic Party's candidate in Niagara Falls in the 2004 federal election and the 2006 federal election finishing third both times.

He was elected as a city councillor in Niagara Falls, Ontario in 2010. In February 2014, he was elected in a provincial by-election in the riding of Niagara Falls. He defeated Progressive Conservative candidate Bart Maves by 962 votes. He was re-elected in the 2014 provincial election defeating PC candidate Bart Maves by 7,424 votes. Gates is the only New Democrat in history to be re-elected in the Niagara Falls riding and holds the record for highest vote tally of any candidate ever in the Niagara Falls provincial riding, at 24,123 votes. He surpassed that record in 2018 by winning 30,161 votes.

Gates has served in several critic portfolio roles as part of the Ontario NDP caucus, including Transportation, Economic Development, and Consumer Services. He is currently one of the Official Opposition's critics for labour issues in the caucus and is the lead critic for worker's health & safety issues.

In 2016, he scored a major victory by winning unanimous support for his motion to address lengthy wait times for MRI services in Niagara. He continues to advocate for healthcare issues, is a major proponent for the building of the New Niagara Falls Hospital, and has tabled legislation for universal coverage for PSA testing in Ontario.

Electoral record

		

		

|align="left" colspan=2|N.D.P. gain from Liberal 
|align="right"|Swing
|align="right"|  +14.82%

References

External links

Canadian trade unionists
Living people
New Democratic Party candidates for the Canadian House of Commons
Niagara Falls, Ontario city councillors
Ontario New Democratic Party MPPs
21st-century Canadian politicians
Year of birth missing (living people)